The 2017 MAAC women's soccer tournament was the postseason women's soccer tournament for the Metro Atlantic Athletic Conference held from October 28 through November 1, 2017. The ten-match tournament took place at ESPN Wide World of Sports Complex in Lake Buena Vista, Florida. The eleven-team single-elimination tournament consisted of four rounds based on seeding from regular season conference play. The Monmouth Hawks were the defending champions and successfully defended their title.

Bracket

Schedule

First Round

Quarterfinals

Semifinals

Final

Statistics

Goalscorers 

3 Goals
 Madie Gibson - Monmouth
 Erica Modena - Manhattan

2 Goals
 Annie Doerr - Manhattan
 Nadya Gill - Quinnipiac
 Arianna Montefusco - Manhattan
 Lexi Palladino - Monmouth

1 Goal
 Nicole Aylmer - Manhattan
 Madi Belvito - Siena
 Madison Borowiec - Quinnipiac
 Alli DeLuca - Monmouth
 Marissa Dundas - Iona
 Lindsey Healy - Manhattan
 Jessica Johnson - Monmouth
 Alex Madden - Fairfield
 Meghan McCabe - Rider
 Jazlyn Moya - Monmouth
 Valeria Pascuet - Rider
 Al Pelletier - Quinnipiac
 Hannah Reiter - Quinnipiac
 Rachelle Ross - Monmouth
 Cameron Santers - Rider
 Emma Saul  - Manhattan
 Ellie Smith - Rider
 Brooke Trotta - St. Peter's
 Madison Vasquez - Siena

See also 
 2017 MAAC Men's Soccer Tournament

References 

 
Metro Atlantic Athletic Conference Women's Soccer Tournament